Fronhausen is a municipality in the south of Marburg-Biedenkopf district in the administrative region of Gießen in Hessen, Germany.

The municipal area stretches along the district's southern boundary in the Lahn valley and its environs between Marburg and Gießen, and borders in the north on the community of Weimar, in the east on the community of Ebsdorfergrund, in the south on the towns of Staufenberg and Lollar, and in the west on the community of Lohra.

It was formed out of seven former communities in the early 1970s as part of Hessen's municipal reforms at that time. The former communities were:

Bellnhausen  
Erbenhausen
Fronhausen
Hassenhausen
Holzhausen
Oberwalgern
Sichertshausen

Politics

Municipal council

Since the last municipal elections held in March 2006, the seats on the municipal council have been distributed thus:

Coat of arms
The civic coat of arms might be described thus: In gules a bend sinister wavy argent; above, a wing argent; below, seven lozenges argent.

The arms were chosen from many proposals put forth after the greater community was formed. The bend sinister (the band) stands for the river Lahn, which flows through the community. The wing comes from the historic Fronhausen reeves' arms, and the lozenges from the Stewards (Schenken) of Schweinsberg, who were formerly the local nobility; the number of lozenges – seven – also represents the number of constituent communities.

Transport links
In the community are a connection with the four-lane Federal Highway (Bundesstraße) B 3, and a stop on the Main-Weser railway, with regional and regional express service.

Partnerships
  Sonchamp, France
  Clairefontaine-en-Yvelines, France
  La Celle-les-Bordes, France

All these partner communities are near Rambouillet.

Sons and daughters of the community
 Heinrich Bastian (1875–1967), Regional poet from Fronhausen

References

External links

Community's official website

Marburg-Biedenkopf